Sent for You Yesterday is a novel by the American writer John Edgar Wideman, first published in 1983 (in New York by Avon Books, and subsequently in London by Allison and Busby, 1984), set in Pittsburgh, Pennsylvania, during the 1970s.

The novel tells the story of Albert Wilkes, who, after seven years on the run, returns to Homewood, an African-American neighborhood of the East End.

Sent for You Yesterday is the third volume of what some critics call "The Homewood Trilogy". The other books are Damballah and Hiding Place, both published in 1981. In 1992 the University of Pittsburgh Press published the three in one volume under the title The Homewood Books. In its preface Wideman admits discomfort with the term trilogy because it implies a plan of linking the volumes, and he did not compose the books that way.

References

1983 American novels
Novels set in Pittsburgh
Fiction set in the 1970s
Novels by John Edgar Wideman
Avon (publisher) books
PEN/Faulkner Award for Fiction-winning works
African-American novels